Emile Nicolaas George Temperman (born 5 December 1991) is a South African rugby union player who most recently played for the . His regular position is scrum-half.

Rugby career

2008–2009: Schoolboy rugby

Temperman was born in Nylstroom, but grew up in Frankfort and Nelspruit.

2010: SWD Eagles

After high school, Temperman moved to George, where he joined the  rugby team. He also made a single appearance for their Under-21 team against the s.

2011–2015: UP Tuks and Blue Bulls

Temperman returned north for the 2011 season, joining the University of Pretoria's rugby team, . He was named in their squad for the 2011 Varsity Cup, but failed to appear in the competition. His next action in a national competition came in the latter half of 2012, as he represented the  team in the Under-21 Provincial Championship. He made twelve appearances – ten of those as a replacement – and scored a try in their match against  as the team made it all the way to the final of the competition.

Temperman played in seven matches of UP Tuks' 2014 Varsity Cup disappointing campaign, which saw them miss out on a semi-final spot after finishing in sixth position, and a further seven in 2015, where an improved showing saw the team finish top of the log before losing in the semi-finals against . Temperman was mainly utilised as a replacement during his three Varsity Cup campaigns, making just one start, and he was not selected to represent the Blue Bulls in any further matches.

2016–present: Pumas

For 2016, Temperman returned to Nelspruit, joining the  prior to their 2016 Currie Cup qualification campaign. He appeared regularly for the Pumas throughout the campaign, making a total of five starts and eight appearances as a replacement in their 14 matches, as his side finished the competition in fourth position to secure qualification to the Currie Cup Premier Division.

References

South African rugby union players
Living people
1991 births
People from Modimolle Local Municipality
Rugby union scrum-halves
Blue Bulls players
Pumas (Currie Cup) players
Rugby union players from Limpopo